La Camocha is a mining neighbourhood located in the rural district parish of Vega (Gijón / Xixón) in the Principality of Asturias, Spain.

The town rose surrounding the La Camocha coal mine.

See also
 Vega
 La Camocha, Asturias coal mine

Gijón